Barker House may refer to:

 Barker House (Vance County, North Carolina), listed on the NRHP in North Carolina

in the United States
(by state then city)
 Woodleaf, Yuba County, California, an unincorporated community also known as Barker House
 Barker House (Manitou Springs, Colorado), listed on the National Register of Historic Places (NRHP)
John Barker House, Wallingford, Connecticut, listed on the NRHP in Connecticut
 Barker House (Michigan City, Indiana), listed on the NRHP
John H. Barker Mansion, Michigan City, Indiana, listed on the NRHP
Stephen Barker House, Methuen, Massachusetts, listed on the NRHP
George A. Barker House, Quincy, Massachusetts, listed on the NRHP
Henry F. Barker House, Quincy, Massachusetts, listed on the NRHP
Richard Barker Octagon House, Worcester, Massachusetts, listed on the NRHP
 Barker House (Edenton, North Carolina), listed on the NRHP
Judge Joseph Barker, Jr., House, Newport, Ohio, listed on the NRHP
William Barker Residence, Ghent, Ohio, listed on the NRHP in Ohio
Col. Joseph Barker House, Marietta, Ohio, listed on the NRHP in Ohio
Benjamin Barker House, Tiverton, Rhode Island, listed on the NRHP
 Barker House (Houston, Texas), listed on the NRHP in Texas